Timeless Stories of El Salvador is a series of fairytales and legends by Salvadoran author Federico Navarrete. The first volume was published in 2020 in Łódź, Poland, and the second was published in 2022 in Madrid, Spain. Both were published independently in collaboration with the Embassy of El Salvador in Germany.

Each volume contains thirty-one fairytales and legends from all over El Salvador. The vast majority were written and interpreted informally on a blog during the writer's stay in Poland. The stories are based on his experiences in El Salvador and books, newspapers, encyclopedias, and blogs he read over the years. This series of books is the first collection of Salvadoran folklore in English.

The stories that make up Timeless Stories of El Salvador, the first series of books by Federico Navarrete, focus on urban, colonial, indigenous legends (from mainly Pipil, Maya, and Lenca origins) as well as stories that have been transmitted by oral tradition for generations. Each story was adapted using cultural intelligence to reach the non-Spanish-speaking population.

The book collection was presented at the Buch Wien 2022 book fair in Vienna, Austria. The presentation was made in collaboration with the Instituto Cervantes in Vienna and the Embassy of El Salvador in Austria.

The first volume was translated into Spanish by Lilliam Armijo in 2022.

Stories 
The first volume contains:

 The good and the bad Cadejo
 The Siguanaba
 Cipitio
 The Headless Priest
 The Black Knight
 The Guirola Family
 The Partideño
 The Squeaky Wagon
 The Owls
 The Lady of the Rings
 The Cuyancua
 The Fair Judge of the Night
 The Managuas
 Chasca "The virgin of the water"
 The Fleshless Woman
 The Enchanted Ulupa Lagoon
 Our Lady Saint Anne
 The Midnight Yeller
 The Lempa River
 Devil's Door
 Comizahual "The white woman"
 Izalco Volcano
 The Moon's Cave
 The Amate Tree
 The Pig Witch
 The Tabudo
 Mr. Money and Mrs. Fortune
 Princess Naba and the Balsam Tree
 The Tamales Woman of Cuzcachapa Lagoon
 The Living Rock of Nahuizalco
 Alegria Lagoon Siren

The second volume contains:

 Sir Francis Drake, The First Pirate of The Pacific
 The Death of The Sorcerer of La Nahuaterique
 The Mulus
 The Almighty Tlaloc
 The Mysterious Woman of The Toad River
 Lake Ilopango
 The Bewitched Wagon
 The Dwarf
 The Bandari Witch
 The Weeping Woman
 The Virgin of Izalco
 The Headless Horseman
 Tenancin, Cipitio's girlfriend
 Prince Atonal
 The Pirate Treasures of Meanguera Island
 The Black Horse
 Tangaloa "The Guardian of The Sea"
 The Cocoa
 Lake Coatepeque Snake
 The Woman of The Chinchontepec
 The Amate Flower
 Titilcíhuat "The Fire Woman"
 The Arbolarios
 Devil's Pool and its twin
 The Frogfish
 The Eruption of The San Salvador Volcano
 The Giantess of Jocoro
 The Bewitched Rock
 The Old Church of San Dionisio
 The Cukinca Cave
 Cuicuizcatl and The Chinchontepec Underworlds

References 

Works based on legends
Works based on Latin American myths and legends
Works based on fairy tales
Books about Central America
Books about Latin America
Books about El Salvador
Mythology books
Salvadoran literature